('The mouth of the righteous'), WAB 30, is a sacred motet composed by Anton Bruckner in 1879.  is a Gregorian chant used as gradual of the , and as introit I and gradual II of the .

History 
Bruckner composed this gradual on 18 July 1879 and dedicated it to Ignaz Traumihler, choirmaster of St. Florian Abbey.

When Traumihler saw the manuscript, he asked: "" (Is this the whole text?) Therefore, Bruckner added on 28 July 1879 a verse Inveni David in a Gregorian mode followed by a repeat of the Alleluja.

While the first performance was expected on Traumihler's name-day (31 July 1879), it finally occurred four weeks later on 28 August 1879 on the feast of Saint Augustinus. Traumihler conducted while Bruckner played the organ.

The work was first edited by Theodor Rättig, Vienna in 1886, together with three other graduals: Locus iste, Christus factus est and Virga Jesse. In this first edition, something went wrong: the motet and the first Alleluja were issued, but not the extra verse (Inveni David) and the repeat of the Alleluja. The extra verse and the repeat of the Alleluja were — wrongly — classified by Grasberger as a separate work (Inveni David, WAB 20).

 Text and music 
The text of the motet is two verses of Psalm 37, which is Psalm 36 in the Vulgata. The text of the added verse is taken from Psalm 89.
{|
|
|style="padding-left:2em;"|The mouth of the righteous utters wisdom,
and his tongue speaks what is just.
The law of his God is in his heart:
and his feet do not falter.
Alleluia.
I have found David, my servant;
I have anointed him with my holy oil.
Alleluia.
|}
The original work of 18 July 1879, a 69-bar gradual, is scored in Lydian mode for choir a cappella.
On two occasions (bars 9–13 and 51–56) the choir is divided into eight voices. The second part on "Et lingua ejus" (bars 16–42) is a fugato without any alteration. The last sentence, on "et non supplantabuntur" (bars 65-69), is sung pianissimo by the soprano, on a sustained tonic chord by the five other voices. It is followed by a two-bar unison Alleluja in Ionian mode.

On 28 July 1879, Bruckner added an extra verse Inveni David scored for unison male voices with organ accompaniment, and a repeat of the 2-bar Alleluja. According to Elisabeth Maier the melody of the Alleluja is a quote of the Alleluja of the introit In medio ecclesiae of the Missa de Doctoribus. The extra verse is apparently Bruckner's own composition.

Traumihler was a fervent supporter of the Cecilian Movement; the reason why Bruckner composed this motet in Lydian mode, without any alteration in the key and in the whole score, and with large use of unaltered chords.

 Selected discography 

The first recording of Os justi occurred in 1931:
 Ludwig Berberich, Münchner Domchor – 78 rpm: Christschall 141
The large majority of the recordings follows the first edition, sometimes without Alleluja. A selection among the about 120 recordings:
 George Guest, St. John's College Choir Cambridge, The World of St. John's 1958–1977 – LP: Argo ZRG 760, 1973
 Matthew Best, Corydon Singers, Bruckner: Motets – CD: Hyperion CDA66062, 1982
 Elmar Hausmann, Capella Vocale St. Aposteln Köln, Anton Bruckner, Missa solemnis in B, Motetten – LP: Aulos AUL 53 569, 1983
 Wolfgang Schäfer, Freiburg Vocal Ensemble, Anton Bruckner: Motetten – CD: Christophorus 74 501, 1984
 Philippe Herreweghe, la Chapelle Royale/Collegium Vocale, Ensemble Musique Oblique, Bruckner: Messe en mi mineur; Motets – CD: Harmonia Mundi France HMC 901322, 1989
 Joseph Pancik, Prager Kammerchor, Anton Bruckner: Motetten / Choral-Messe – CD: Orfeo C 327 951 A, 1993
 John Eliot Gardiner, Monteverdi Choir, Bruckner: Mass No. 1; Motets – CD: DG 459 674-2, 1998
 Hans-Christoph Rademann, NDR Chor Hamburg, Anton Bruckner: Ave Maria – Carus 83.151, 2000
 Petr Fiala, Czech Philharmonic Choir, Anton Bruckner: Motets – CD: MDG 322 1422-2, 2006
 Marcus Creed, SWR Symphony Orchestra and Stuttgart-Radio Vocal Ensemble, Mass in E minor and Motets – CD: Hänssler Classic SACD 93.199, 2007
 Stephen Layton, Polyphony Choir, Bruckner: Mass in E minor & Motets – CD: Hyperion CDA 67629, 2007
 Erwin Ortner, Arnold Schoenberg Chor, Anton Bruckner: Tantum ergo – CD: ASC Edition 3, issue of the choir, 2008
 Philipp Ahmann, MDR Rundfunkchor Leipzig, Anton Bruckner & Michael Haydn - Motets – SACD: Pentatone PTC 5186 868, 2021

There are only a few recordings with the full motet, i.e., with the verse Inveni David:
 Robert Jones, Choir of St. Bride's Church, Bruckner: Motets – CD: Naxos 8.550956, 1994
 Rupert Huber, Südfunkchor Stuttgart, Romantische Chormusik – CD: Hänssler 91 106, 1996; also on YouTube - verse harmonised and sung a cappella
 Duncan Ferguson, Choir of St. Mary's Cathedral of Edinburgh, Bruckner: Motets  – CD: Delphian Records DCD34071, 2010

References

Sources 
 Max Auer, Anton Bruckner als Kirchenmusiker, G. Bosse, Regensburg, 1927
 Anton Bruckner – Sämtliche Werke, Band XXI: Kleine Kirchenmusikwerke, Musikwissenschaftlicher Verlag der Internationalen Bruckner-Gesellschaft, Hans Bauernfeind and Leopold Nowak (Editor), Vienna, 1984/2001
 Uwe Harten, Anton Bruckner. Ein Handbuch, Salzburg, 1996, 
 Cornelis van Zwol, Anton Bruckner 1824–1896 – Leven en werken, uitg. Thoth, Bussum, Netherlands, 2012.

External links 
 
 
  - Verse Inveni David
 Os justi lydisch, WAB 30 Critical discography by Hans Roelofs 
 A performance by Rupert Huber with the Südfunkchor Stuttgart can be heard on YouTube: Os justi, WAB 30 - with harmonised verse Inveni David''

Motets by Anton Bruckner
1879 compositions
Compositions in C major